Drake Peak is an  summit of the Warner Mountains in Lake County, Oregon in the United States. It is located in the Fremont National Forest. The mountain is named in honor of Lieutenant Colonel John M. Drake, a Union Army officer who served in both the 1st Oregon Cavalry and the 1st Oregon Infantry regiments during the American Civil War.

Lookout 

The lookout is a L-4 Aladdin ground cabin, built in 1948. Visitors can drive to the lookout. From there, they can hike across the saddle between the two peaks and then climb to the top of Drake Peak.

Environment  

The north slope of Drake Peak is covered by a ponderosa pine forest while low sagebrush dominates the rockier southern slope.  Some areas also have quaking aspen and several fir species.  Local wild flowers include bitterroot, aster, goldenweed, and penstemon.

The habitats around Drake Peak supports a variety of large mammal species including mule deer, Rocky Mountain elk, pronghorn, American black bear, bobcats, and mountain lions.  Common birds in the sky around Drake Peak include prairie falcons, golden eagles, and bald eagles.

See also
List of mountain peaks of Oregon

References

Mountains of Lake County, Oregon
North American 2000 m summits